Naval pentathlon at the 2019 Military World Games was held in Wuhan, China from 23 to 26 October 2019.

Medal summary

References 
 2019 Military World Games Results - Page 150

Naval pentathlon
2019